Jharkhandi railway station is located in Jharkhandi area of Balrampur district, Uttar Pradesh. It serves Jharkhandi area of Balrampur. Its code is JKNI. It has a single platform. Passenger, DEMU, and Express trains halt here.

Trains

 Gorakhpur–Panvel Express (via Barhni)
 Lokmanya Tilak Terminus–Gorakhpur Lokmanya Express (via Barhni)
 Gorakhpur–Lokmanya Tilak Terminus Express (via Barhni)
 Gorakhpur–Sitapur Express (via Barhni)
 Gorakhpur–Bandra Terminus Express (via Barhni)

References 

Lucknow NER railway division
Railway stations in Balrampur district